The 2013–14 Scottish League One was the 19th season in the current format of 10 teams in the third-tier of Scottish football. This was the first season of the competition being part of the newly formed Scottish Professional Football League after the merger of the Scottish Premier League and the Scottish Football League. Queen of the South were the defending champions.

Rangers were confirmed as champions after a 3–0 home win over Airdrieonians on 12 March 2014. This secured the club's second successive divisional title and promotion to the second tier. This was the earliest anyone had secured a championship title since Partick Thistle won the old First Division in 1975–76.
Rangers were presented with the trophy on 26 April after a 3–0 win against Stranraer at Ibrox.

Teams

Rangers were promoted into the league as 2012–13 Scottish Third Division champions. Airdrieonians were automatically relegated into the league after finishing bottom of the First Division, while Dunfermline were relegated into the league by losing the First Division play-off final to Alloa Athletic, who took their place in the 2013–14 Scottish Championship. Queen of the South were also promoted to the Championship as last season's Second Division champions. East Fife maintained their status in this division by defeating Peterhead in the Second Division play-off final. Peterhead remained in the fourth tier. Albion Rovers were automatically relegated to the fourth tier by finishing bottom of last season's Second Division.

Stadia and locations

League table

Results
Teams play each other four times in this league. In the first half of the season each team plays every other team twice (home and away) and then do the same in the second half of the season, for a total of 36 games

First half of season

Second half of season

League One play-offs

Semi-finals

First leg

Second leg

2–2 on aggregate. East Fife won 7–6 on penalties.

Stirling Albion won 8–4 on aggregate.

Final

First leg

Second leg

Stirling Albion won 3–2 on aggregate.

Top scorers
As of 19 April 2014.

References

External links
Official Site

Scottish League One seasons
3
3
Scot